Máxima may refer to

Máxima (magazine)
 Máxima FM, Spanish radio station
 Queen Máxima of the Netherlands, consort to the King of the Netherlands